The lithium-titanate or lithium-titanium-oxide (LTO) battery is a type of rechargeable battery which has the advantage of being faster to charge than other lithium-ion batteries but the disadvantage of having a much lower energy density.

Uses

Titanate batteries are used in certain Japanese-only versions of Mitsubishi's i-MiEV electric vehicle as well as Honda's EV-neo electric bike and Fit EV. They are also used in the Tosa concept electric bus. Because of the battery's high level of safety and recharge capabilities, LTO batteries are used in car audio applications as well as mobile medical devices.

An LTO battery is also used in the S-Pen that comes with the Samsung Galaxy Note 20 Ultra 5G.

According to a Weatherflow Co. article, the Tempest weather-station device contains a 1300mAh LTO battery, charged via four solar panels, requiring "at least 4 hours of adequate sunlight every two weeks."

Chemistry

A lithium-titanate battery is a modified lithium-ion battery that uses lithium-titanate nanocrystals, instead of carbon, on the surface of its anode. This gives the anode a surface area of about 100 square meters per gram, compared with 3 square meters per gram for carbon, allowing electrons to enter and leave the anode quickly. Also, the redox potential of Li+ intercalation into titanium oxides is more positive than that of Li+ intercalation into graphite. This leads to fast charging (higher charging current) being much safer in the case of the titanate, than in the case of carbon, since lithium dendrites are less likely to form in the former case.

A disadvantage of lithium-titanate batteries is their lower inherent voltage (2.4 V), which leads to a lower specific energy (about 30–110 Wh/kg) than conventional lithium-ion battery technologies, which have an inherent voltage of 3.7 V. Some lithium-titanate batteries, however, have an energy density of up to 177 Wh/L.

Brands and uses

Log9 Materials
The Log9 company is working to introduce its tropicalized-ion battery (TiB) backed by lithium ferro-phosphate (LFP) and lithium-titanium-oxide (LTO) battery chemistries. Unlike LFP and LTO, the more popular NMC (Nickel Manganese Cobalt) chemistry does not have the requisite temperature resilience to survive in the warmest conditions such as in India. LTO is not only temperature resilient, but also has a long life.

Altairnano
Altairnano produces lithium-titanate batteries under the "Nanosafe" line, mainly for battery electric vehicles. Vehicle manufacturers that have announced plans to use Altairnano batteries include Lightning Car Company, which plans to use them for the Lightning GT, an electric sports car; Phoenix Motorcars, for use in its electric sport-utility vehicles; and in Proterra, its electric EcoRide BE35 lightweight 35-foot bus.

Altairnano has also deployed their lithium-titanate energy storage systems for electric grid ancillary services as well as military applications.

Grinergy 
Grinergy is a South Korean battery manufacturer founded in 2017. It offers commercial and Warfighter military grade LTO battery technology. Grinergy is a 2023 CES Innovation Honoree

Leclanché 
Leclanché is a Swiss battery manufacturer founded in 1909. In 2006, it acquired Bullith AG (Germany) to establish a Li-Ion manufacturing line in Germany. In 2014, their product "TiBox" entered the market. The energy content of the TiBox is 3.2 kWh, with an expected 15,000 cycle life span.

Microvast
Microvast, based in Houston, Texas, makes a lithium-titanate battery that it calls "LpTO". In 2011, the world's first ultrafast charge bus fleet was launched in Chongqing, China. An 80 kWh LpTO battery system was installed in 37 twelve-meter electric buses, which can be fully charged within 10 minutes with a 400 kW charger.

As of 2014, a British bus OEM, Wrightbus, began using Microvast LpTO batteries for 1,000 units of double-decker New Routemaster buses. An 18 kWh LpTO battery system is used to replace the initial Lithium Iron Phosphate battery because the LFP battery encountered performance failure.

As of 2015, the European ZeEUS (zero emission urban transport system) was first offered. Its VDL bus uses a 62.5 kWh LpTO battery system from Microvast for a demonstration project.

As of 2016, the world's largest automated port, PSA TUAS, began using the Microvast LpTO for 22 electric AGVs as a first phase of a project for horizontal container transportation.

Samsung
The Bluetooth-enabled S-Pen in the Samsung Galaxy Note 10 and 10+ contains a lithium-titanate battery which has a stand-by time of ten hours.

Seiko
Seiko uses lithium-titanate batteries in its Kinetic (automatic quartz) wristwatches. Earlier Kinetic watches used a capacitor to store energy, but the battery provides a larger capacity and a longer service life. A technician can easily replace the battery when its capacity eventually deteriorates to an unacceptable level.

Toshiba

Toshiba released a lithium-titanate battery, dubbed "Super Charge Ion Battery" (SCiB). The battery is designed to offer 90% charge capacity in ten minutes.

SCiB batteries are used in the Schwinn Tailwind electric bike. Toshiba has also demonstrated its use as a prototype laptop battery. Toshiba SCiB batteries are used in a Japan-only version of Mitsubishi's i-MiEV and Minicab MiEV electric vehicles, and Honda uses them in its EV-neo electric bike and Fit EV, which came to market in the summer of 2012. JR Central's N700S Shinkansen uses SCiB batteries to operate at low speed in the event of a disruption to overhead power.

The Toshiba lithium-titanate battery is low voltage (2.3 nominal voltage), with low energy density (between the lead-acid and lithium ion phosphate), but has extreme longevity, charge/discharge capabilities and a wide range operating temperatures.

YABO
YABO Power Technology released a lithium-titanate battery in 2012. The standard model YB-LITE2344 2.4V/15Ah battery cell has been used in electric vehicle and energy storage systems.

Yinlong Energy 
Gree introduced its Yinlong Battery Technology, a type of fast-charging LTO (lithium-titanate) battery, which can operate in extreme temperature conditions. The batteries have an operational life-span up to 30 years. Yinlong Energy provides batteries for such uses as automobiles and energy storage.

See also
 List of battery types
 List of battery sizes
 Comparison of battery types
 Battery (electricity)
 Electrochemical cell
 Energy storage
 Fuel cell
 Lithium iron phosphate battery

References

Lithium-ion batteries
Rechargeable batteries